Jean Sok also known as BBoy Hourth, is a French-born one-legged professional breakdancer.

Sok is known for performing in Cirque du Soleil's Michael Jackson tribute The Immortal World Tour and performance at the 2012 Billboard Music Awards as a backup dancer for Goodie Mob. He uses “b-boy” style techniques and incorporates his crutches into his moves,. He uses his crutches as an extension of his arms.

Sok started dancing at age 15.

References

Cirque du Soleil performers
French male dancers
Date of birth missing (living people)
Place of birth missing (living people)
French people of South Korean descent
Living people
Year of birth missing (living people)